Nguyễn Sĩ Bình is a South Vietnam-born Vietnamese American democracy activist. He serves as the Chairman of the People's Action Party of Vietnam.

Nguyen Si Binh attended the University of Maryland, College Park and graduated with a degree in Nuclear Engineering in 1981.

He worked for Bechtel Corporation, then in 1988 settled in Atlanta, Georgia, and joined a real estate developing firm as a Regional Manager.

On April 25, 1991, he and 16 members of this party were arrested in Vietnam, while trying to form a secondary political party. The government of Vietnam charged him with trying to overthrow the government.

References

External links
Return to Vietnam lands him in Jail Atlanta Journal

University of Maryland, College Park alumni
American democracy activists
Vietnamese democracy activists
Vietnamese emigrants to the United States
Year of birth missing (living people)
Living people
People's Action Party of Vietnam politicians